The Raptor is a nameplate used by Ford for its "high-performance" pickup trucks and SUVs. In use since the 2010 model year, the Raptor is designated as the highest-performance version of the F-150, Ranger and Bronco. Drawing its name from both birds of prey and the velociraptor, the model line is intended as a street-legal counterpart of an off-road racing trophy truck. The F-150 Raptor is currently in its third generation; the Ranger Raptor was introduced in 2019 (in markets outside of North America) while the Bronco Raptor was released in late 2021.  

Optimized for off-road use, the Raptor is fitted with four-wheel drive as standard equipment, a mid-travel suspension system, and all-terrain tires. The model is also equipped with the most powerful engines available in the F-150/Ranger lines. Along with wider fenders, the Raptor is fitted with its own grille, replacing the Ford Blue Oval emblem with large "FORD" lettering in the grille.



F-150 Raptor

First generation (SVT Raptor; 2010) 

For the 2010 model year, Ford SVT introduced the F-150 SVT Raptor, its second vehicle derived from the Ford F-150.  In notable contrast to the on-road capability of the 1993–2004 SVT Lightning, the SVT Raptor was optimized for off-road performance, similar to a desert racing vehicle. "Raptor" was initially the vehicle's placeholder nickname during development, with Ford having to come to an arrangement with Mosler for the Raptor name rights.

The first production Raptor, molten orange with the digital mud graphic, sold at auction for $130,000 with all proceeds above the MSRP going to charity. The race version, the F-150 SVT Raptor R, was built for the Baja 1000 races.

Chassis upgrades    
SVT fitted the Raptor with Fox Racing internal bypass shocks with external reservoirs, allowing for 11.2 inches of front suspension travel, and 12.1 inches in the rear. To accommodate the long-travel suspension design, the rear leaf springs and the front upper and lower A-arms were redesigned, with SVT widening the track by seven inches and raising the ride height by two inches.        

The rear axle had a locking differential with a 4.10:1 gear ratio, with an open-differential front axle.  For 2012, the open front axle was replaced by a Torsen helical gear limited slip differential.  In place of the all-season tires of the F-150, the Raptor was fitted with 315/70/17" BFGoodrich KO tires.

Powertrain 
For 2010, the standard engine was a 5.4L V8 with 320 hp and 390 lb-ft of torque, while an optional  6.2L V8 (shared with the Super Duty) churned out 411 hp and 434 lb-ft.  Both engines were paired with a 6-speed automatic transmission.  For 2011, the 5.4L engine was dropped from the F-Series, leaving the 6.2L V8 as the only engine offering.

Driving technology 
Alongside other versions of the F-Series, the F-150 SVT Raptor was equipped with anti-locking braking (ABS), stability control (AdvanceTrac with RSC), and traction control.  To optimize its capability as both an off-road and on-road vehicle, the SVT Raptor included several design features to maximize traction and control.  The first Ford with hill descent control, the SVT Raptor was designed to use ABS to minimize driver modulation of the brakes (to increase control of the steering).  In off-road settings, the Raptor can be driven in sport mode (traction control off) and "full off-road" mode (no electronic intervention except ABS; throttle and ABS reprogrammed for low traction).

Body design 

Coinciding with the widened track and upgraded suspension, the SVT Raptor received several changes to its exterior.  Sharing only its cabin and headlamps with the standard F-150, the SVT Raptor is fitted with a model-specific front fascia, with a composite hood, wider fenders (at 86.3 inches wide, the Raptor was fitted with grille-mounted clearance lamps) and the Ford Blue Oval replaced by "FORD" lettering in the grille.  Though not using the Flareside configuration, the cargo bed was redesigned to accommodate the wider rear track and tires; to shorten its wheelbase and maximize its breakover angle, a 5.5-foot bed was used.

For 2010, the F-150 SVT Raptor was offered solely as a 2+2 door SuperCab (a regular cab Raptor was never developed) and was offered in four colors: Tuxedo Black, Oxford White, Blue Flame, and Molten Orange.  As an option, Ford offered a "digital mud" vinyl decal for the rear sides of the vehicle.   For 2011, a four-door SuperCrew cab configuration was introduced, alongside a fifth color: Ingot Silver.

Largely equipped between the F-150 XLT and Lariat, the SVT Raptor is fitted with several interior features specific to the model line, serving as functional upgrades.  Alongside high-bolstered seats, an orange stripe was added to the leather wrap of the steering wheel (serving as a visual centering reference).  In line with the Super Duty, the SVT Raptor was prewired for aftermarket equipment.

Second generation (2017) 

Following the 2014 introduction of the thirteenth-generation F-Series, the Raptor model line went on a two-year hiatus.  Unveiled as a pre-production vehicle in January 2015 at the 2015 Detroit International Auto Show, the second generation of the Raptor was released in early 2017 for the 2017 model year, dropping the SVT prefix.  As with its predecessor, the second-generation Raptor is a pickup truck derived from the F-150, optimized for off-road capability.    

As with the standard F-150, the Raptor is an aluminum-intensive vehicle, using steel primarily for the frame rails; compared to the SVT Raptor, curb weight was reduced by over 500 pounds.

Chassis specifications 
As with the previous generation, the Raptor retained Fox Racing internal-bypass shocks with external reservoirs.  With larger shocks (3 inches, from 2.5), wheel travel increased to 13 inches for the front axle (13.9 for the rear).   An all-new transfer case was introduced; a torque-on-demand system, the design combined the on-demand capability of all-wheel drive with the durability of four-wheel drive.   With a widened track over the F-150, the Raptor again used a leaf-sprung rear axle and upper and lower A-arms for the front axle. For 2019, the Fox Racing shocks were updated with "Live Valve" capability, automatically adjusting for the terrain.   

As before, 35-inch all-terrain tires were fitted to 17-inch wheels; as a rare option for a mass-produced vehicle, Ford offered beadlock wheels to prevent tire bead separation from the wheel at low pressures.

Powertrain 
In a significant departure from its predecessor, the second-generation Raptor was not offered with a V8 engine, instead using a high-output second-generation 3.5L EcoBoost gasoline V6.  Using a detuned version of the engine used in the Ford GT, rated at 450 hp and 510 lb-ft of torque, the twin-turbo EcoBoost is also shared with the Lincoln Navigator. The 2017 Raptor marked the debut of the 10-speed 10R80 automatic transmission, the first non-commercial vehicle fitted with a 10-speed transmission (of any type).

Body design 

As with the standard F-150, much of the body of the Raptor is constructed of aluminum, using a composite hood.  In line with the previous generation, the "FORD" grille replaced the Ford Blue Oval emblem, with clearance lights mounted in the grille and front fenders (mandated due to its width). Sharing its 5.5-foot length with the SuperCrew, the pickup bed design is specific to the Raptor.  

Alongside the previous generation, the Raptor is offered in both SuperCab and SuperCrew configurations. The "digital mud" decal option was replaced by a large black decal on the pickup bed, denoting the Raptor name; as an additional option, a black "FORD" tailgate decal is offered.

Third generation (2021) 

Ford introduced the third generation F-150 Raptor in February 2021; the new base model retains the same 3.5-liter EcoBoost V6 engine as its predecessor. For the first time ever on a production light-duty truck, the 2021 Ford Raptor will offer 37” tires from the factory. Ford also confirmed the return of a V8 powered Raptor, the Raptor R, utilizing a 5.2L Predator supercharged V8 engine which produces 700 hp (522 kW) and 640 lb-ft (868 Nm), similar to the one in the Mustang Shelby GT500, to compete against the new Ram 1500 TRX. The rear suspension of the Raptor no longer uses leaf springs, opting instead to have coil springs and a five link setup with Panhard bar.

Ranger Raptor

First generation (2019) 

For the 2019 model year, Ford introduced the Ranger Raptor, derived from the global Ranger T6 mid-size pickup truck.  Slotted above the Wildtrak appearance package, the Raptor is fitted with suspension and chassis upgrades to improve its off-road capability.  In line with its F-150 namesake, the Raptor is fitted with a widened track and a raised ride height.  

The Ranger Raptor is fitted with a 2.0L EcoBlue biturbo diesel engine, producing 210 hp.  Shared with globally-marketed versions of the Ford Transit and the Ford Everest, the engine is coupled to a 10-speed automatic transmission (shared with the F-150, including the Raptor).  Similar to F-150 Raptor, the four-wheel drive system of the Ranger Raptor is adaptable to terrain.  

While not wide enough to require clearance lights, the Ranger Raptor adopts several design elements of its F-150 counterpart, including gray six-spoke wheels, a FORD-lettered grille, and large Raptor decals on the sides of the cargo bed.

North American exclusion 
In October 2018, Ford confirmed that the Ranger Raptor will not be marketed in the United States (until the second generation).  While the marketing of the model would have offered Ford a direct competitor to the Chevrolet Colorado ZR2, Ford has cited the risk of model overlap with the larger F-150 Raptor (a model whose demand exceeds supply).  A secondary factor is the powertrain design: as the 2.0L EcoBlue diesel engine (not yet approved for US emissions standards) offers similar output to the regular Ranger's 2.3-liter EcoBoost gasoline engine; a redesign to include a more powerful engine was cited as too costly.  

While unlikely to be sold in North America in its first generation, as a mid-size truck, the Ranger Raptor is sold in markets where the F-Series based Raptor is unlikely to be widely marketed because of its larger size, although in some markets such as Argentina and Mexico, the Ranger Raptor is sold alongside the F-150 Raptor.

Second generation (2022) 

The second-generation Ranger Raptor was unveiled in February 2022. The second-generation Ranger Raptor will be sold in the United States and Canada starting in 2023.

Bronco Raptor 

For the 2022 model year, Ford introduced the Bronco Raptor. It was developed under the codename "Warthog". It has 37-inch tires, a 3.0-liter twin-turbo EcoBoost V6 and 10-speed automatic transmission shared with the Ford Explorer.

In notable popular culture 

 Every main Forza game title since Forza Motorsport 4.
 The Crew series.
 The Vapid Caracara from Grand Theft Auto V (both 4x4 and 6x6 versions) are based on the second generation 2017–2020 F-150 Raptor, along with the Henessey Velociraptor 6x6.

References 

Ford Motor Company
Pickup trucks
Cars introduced in 2009
2010s cars
2020s cars